Neosmerinthothrips is a genus of thrips in the family Phlaeothripidae.

Species
 Neosmerinthothrips affinis
 Neosmerinthothrips annulipes
 Neosmerinthothrips brevicollis
 Neosmerinthothrips collaris
 Neosmerinthothrips diversicolor
 Neosmerinthothrips fijiensis
 Neosmerinthothrips fructuum
 Neosmerinthothrips grandicauda
 Neosmerinthothrips hamiltoni
 Neosmerinthothrips hilaris
 Neosmerinthothrips hoodi
 Neosmerinthothrips inquilinus
 Neosmerinthothrips insularis
 Neosmerinthothrips nigrisetis
 Neosmerinthothrips parvidens
 Neosmerinthothrips paulistarum
 Neosmerinthothrips picticornis
 Neosmerinthothrips plaumanni
 Neosmerinthothrips robustus
 Neosmerinthothrips variipes
 Neosmerinthothrips xylebori

References

Phlaeothripidae
Thrips
Thrips genera